Red Giants is a Dutch basketball club based in Meppel, Drenthe. Founded in 1974 as Alcides, the club reached the Eredivisie in 1987. It played in the Dutch highest tier league until 1996. In 1994, Red Giants won the NBB Cup. Currently, it plays in the Promotiedivisie. Home games are played in the Sportcentrum Ezinge.

Honours
NBB Cup
Winners (1): 1993–94

Promotiedivisie
Winners (1): 2015–16

List of head coaches

References

Basketball teams in the Netherlands
Sports clubs in Meppel